Ezeriș is a commune in Caraș-Severin County, western Romania with a population of 1,410 people. It is composed of two villages, Ezeriș and Soceni (Szocsán).

References

Communes in Caraș-Severin County
Localities in Romanian Banat